Grantham Canal SSSI is a  biological Site of Special Scientific Interest which runs along a stretch of the Grantham Canal and its banks between Redmile and Harby in Leicestershire.

This site has diverse aquatic and terrestrial habitats, which supports a varied insect community. The canal has floating plants such as fat duckweed and water fern, and there are breeding birds such as sedge warblers, moorhens and reed warblers.

There is access to the canal towpath.

References

Sites of Special Scientific Interest in Leicestershire
Redmile